The November 1876 Connecticut gubernatorial election was held on November 7, 1876. Democratic nominee Richard D. Hubbard defeated Republican nominee H. Robinson with 50.84% of the vote.

This was the first gubernatorial election held in November, as previous state elections in Connecticut were held in early April. As the term length for the governor had been extended from one year to two, Hubbard would be the first governor of Connecticut to serve a two-year term, and the first whose term began in early January. The previous inauguration date was in early May.

General election

Candidates
Major party candidates
Richard D. Hubbard, Democratic
H. Robinson, Republican

Other candidates
Joseph Cummings, Prohibition
Charles Atwater, Greenback

Results

References

1876
Connecticut
Gubernatorial